The Dadiyan family was an Ottoman Armenian family that was famous for their industrial activities within the Ottoman Empire. Besides being prominent factory owners (the family had a monopoly on the empire's gunpowder industry for more than a century), members of the family also served as political advisers. The Dadiyans were also well acquainted with Ottoman banking. 

Ohannes Dadiyan was the director of the gunpowder factory in 1845.

References

Armenian families
Armenians from the Ottoman Empire
Families from the Ottoman Empire